The Candidate (Aka: The Playmates for the Candidate, Party Girls for the Candidate, & Kisses for the Candidate) is a 1964 low-budgeted film that starred the 1950s sex symbol Mamie Van Doren. Co-starring in the film were June Wilkinson, Ted Knight, and Eric Mason; Rachel Romen, Robin Raymond, William Long, Jr., and John Matthews, played smaller less meaningful parts. The film had several different filming/release titles like: The Playmates for the Candidate, Party Girls for the Candidate, and Kisses for the Candidate; however, it is mainly known as being titled, The Candidate.

Plot

Cast
 Mamie Van Doren as Samantha Ashley
 June Wilkinson as Angela Wallace 
 Ted Knight as Frank Carlton 
 Eric Mason as Buddy Parker 
 Rachel Romen as Mona Archer 
 Robin Raymond as Attorney Rogers 
 William Long, Jr. as Falon 
 John Matthews as Sen. Harper

References

External links
 
 
 
 

1964 films
Films about elections
1960s English-language films